Nucleic Acids Research is an open-access peer-reviewed scientific journal published since 1974 by the Oxford University Press. The journal covers research on nucleic acids, such as DNA and RNA, and related work. According to the Journal Citation Reports, the journal's 2021 impact factor is 19.160. The journal publishes two yearly special issues, the first issue of each year is dedicated to biological databases, published in January since 1993, and the other is devoted to papers describing web-based software resources of value to the biological community (web servers), published in July since 2003.

References

External links
 
 Archives | https://www.ncbi.nlm.nih.gov/pmc/journals/4/

Biochemistry journals
Open access journals
Publications established in 1974
Oxford University Press academic journals
Biweekly journals
English-language journals